Gusii Stadium is a multi-use stadium in Kisii, Kenya.  It is used mostly for football matches and is the home stadium of Shabana Kisii.  The stadium holds over 5,000 people.

Football venues in Kenya
Sport in Nyanza Province